Dr. Nancy Makokha Baraza (born 1957 in Bungoma District, Western Kenya)  is a former Kenyan judge.  She was the first Deputy Chief Justice of Kenya and a member of Kenya's first supreme court after the promulgation of the 2010 Constitution. She served in the court from  June 2011 to her suspension in January 2012 and subsequently resigned on 18 October 2012.
She was appointed to the Kenya Law Reform Commission in 2008 for a term of three years, serving as a vice chairperson until her appointment as deputy CJ. In early 2010, she was elected chairperson of the Media Council of Kenya’s Ethics and Complaints Commission.

Federation of Women Lawyers of Kenya
She is a former chairperson of the Kenyan chapter of the Federation of Women Lawyers(FIDA), a group known for its strong advocacy of democracy, women’s and children’s rights.

Kenya Review Commission
She served in Yash Pal Ghai’s original Constitution of Kenya Review Commission, which produced the Bomas draft constitution, a document that served as one of the reference drafts for the constitution passed in 2010.

Appointment of as Deputy Chief justice
The Judicial Service Commission carried out public interviews for the chief justice and deputy chief justice positions in May 2011. The commission nominated lawyers Willy Munyoki Mutunga and Nancy Baraza for the positions of Kenya's chief justice and deputy chief justice respectively. The names were forwarded to President Mwai Kibaki, who then submitted them to Parliament after consultation with the prime minister Raila Odinga where they were approved.

University of Nairobi 
Nancy Baraza earned Doctor of Laws PhD from the University of Nairobi in 2016. She also is a senior lecturer and Chairperson of the department of Public law, at the School of Law, University of Nairobi. She teaches family law, social foundations of law and development, jurisprudence and access to justice.

Baraza-Kerubo Village Market Incident

In January 2012, the Judicial Service Commission formed a sub-committee to investigate reports that Deputy Chief Justice Nancy Baraza assaulted a female security guard at the Village Market shopping mall on 31 December 2011. The JSC subsequently recommended her suspension to President Mwai Kibaki and requested the President to appoint a tribunal to investigate her conduct in line with Article 168 (4) of the Constitution. After her suspension, a commission formed to investigate her conduct recommended her removal from office. On 18 October, she subsequently resigned after withdrawing her supreme court appeal of the tribunal's verdict.

References

1957 births
Living people
21st-century Kenyan judges
20th-century Kenyan lawyers
Kenyan women judges
People from Bungoma County
21st-century women judges